Music of Minang is a traditional and living genre of Indonesian music that grows and develops in the Minangkabau culture area. Music whose origins are related to Malay Music is generally played by musical instruments such as Talempong, Saluang, Minang rebab, Serunai, Tmbourine, Aguang, Gandang, and Violin. Minang music is also played to accompany various dances such as the Pasambahan dance and the Piring dance.

Early Origins of Malay Music from Qasidah and Gurindam 
With hindsight, the beginning of Malay Music has its roots in Qasidah which originated as the arrival and spread of Islam in the archipelago in the years 635 - 1600 from Arabic, Gujarati and Persian, its character was readings of poetry and then sung. Therefore, initially the poetry used was originally sung from Gurindam, and was gradually used to accompany the dance.

At the time since the opening of the Suez Canal there was a flow of migration of Arabs and Egyptians to the Dutch East Indies in 1870 until after 1888, they brought Gambus instruments and played Arabic music. This influence is also mixed with traditional music with Gurindam poetry and local traditional musical instruments such as the gong, saluang, serunai, tambourine, talempong, violin, etc.

Then around 1955 Modern Minang Music was born, of course this style of playing music is far different from its origin as Qasidah, because the development of this period is not only singing Gurindam poetry, but has far developed as entertainment music for singing and accompaniment of Pas added dance, plate dance, dance. Payung, Serampang Twelve dance typical of the Minang people on the west coast of Sumatra.

Minang type of Music

Original Minang Music 
Minang music was originally from Qasidah which originated as the arrival and spread of Islam in the archipelago in the years 635 - 1600 from Arabic, Gujarat and Persian, its character is reading religious poetry and then reading Gurindam, then gradually used also to accompany dances. The musical instruments used are only limited to percussion instruments in the form of striking bamboo, wood and stone, then also tambourines.

Traditional Minang music 
Traditional Minang music is characterized by the Minang style or rent and traditional Minang musical instruments . Minang traditional musical instruments (see description below), namely: Saluang, Agung, Gondang, Rebana, Serunai, Talempong, Rebab, Bansi.

Modern Minang Music 1955 
Modern Minang music played by Gumarang, Teruna Ria, Kumbang Tjari, and Zaenal Combo. Modern Minang music is influenced by Latin music with bongo punches and marakas games, usually a rhythm similar to rumba, cha-cha, or mambo. Modern Minang music is also the forerunner of Dangdut along with Malay Music. The musical instruments used developed with the entry of European musical instruments such as accordion, violin, guitar, piano or keyboard, bass, drums, bongo, saxophone, clarinet, trumpet, flute, maracas, etc.

Musical Instruments

Saluang 
Saluang is a traditional musical instrument typical of Minangkabau, West Sumatra. This wind instrument is made of thin bamboo or gutters, where the Minangkabau people believe that the best material for making saluang comes from gutters for clothespins or gutters that are found drifting in the river.

In this class of musical instruments is the flute, but there are only four holes. Saluang length is approximately 40-60 cm, with a diameter of 3-4 cm. Talang is also used to make lemang, the traditional Minangkabau sticky rice cake. This instrument can produce sound by blowing it at the corner of the edge or the upper cavity. So that in accordance with the principles of acoustic physics, the blow that comes out of the mouth will vibrate the inner walls of the saluang in such a way as to produce sound. Saluang is set with several holes, usually there are 4 holes. That way saluang can produce diatonic tone frequencies. This is also one of the hallmarks of this instrument. 

The legendary saluang player named Idris Sutan Sati with his singer Syamsimar. 

The virtue of these saluang players is that they can play the saluang by blowing and inhaling simultaneously, so that the saluang player can play the instrument from the beginning of the end of the song without breaking. This mode of breathing is developed with constant practice. This technique is also known as the angok elimination technique. Not just anyone who can blow this Saluang, requires special training in order to be able to make Saluang's distinctive sound, which is dark, mysterious and ghotic. Each village in Minangkabau has developed a way of blowing the saluang, so that each village has its own style. Examples of this style are Singgalang, Pariaman, Solok Salayo, Koto Tuo, Suayan and Pauah.

The Singgalang style is considered quite difficult to play by beginners, and usually this Singgalang tone is played at the beginning of the song. The saddest style is Ratok Solok from the Solok area. Meanwhile, the type of saluang which can be said to be deadly, comes from the Payakumbuah area, has a magical nuance, as an introduction to magic, is colored with magic lyrics, known as Saluang Sirompak, derived from the root word rompak, which means force. 

Basirompak is an effort to force one's mind -with the help of supernatural powers- to obey the wishes of those who pirate. This ritual is performed by a pawang (sirompak craftsman) who is assisted by a saluang sirompak player and a soybean craftsman. The handler is tasked with singing mantras and playing a top (gasiang tangkurak), one part of which is made from pieces of a human skull.

Often this ritual is performed in Saluang media, so it is known as Basirompak, an art related to shamanic ritual activities or magic song. If a man is insulted and insulted by a woman whom the man likes, then the man asks the devil for help with the help of the shaman through syringe. So, the insulting woman became crazy about him and found it difficult to forget the man.

The game of Saluang is usually in a crowd event such as a marriage ceremony, a house batagak, a pangulu batagak, and others. This game is usually held after the Isha prayer and ends near dawn. On another occasion, the beautiful Minang virgins contain messages, satire, and also subtle criticism that restore the listener's memory of their hometown or of the life that has been, is, and will be lived.

Bansi (Minang flute) 
Bansi or Suling Minang with 7 holes (like a recorder), is short, and can play traditional and modern songs because it has a standard (diatonic) tone. Bansi size is about 33.5 - 36 cm with a diameter between 2.5-3 cm. Bansi is also made of gutters (thin bamboo) or sariak (a type of thin, thin bamboo). 

This musical instrument is a bit difficult to play, in addition to the length that is hard to reach by the fingers, it is also difficult to blow it.

Pupuik Batang Padi 
This traditional musical instrument is made from rice stalks. At the end of the stem segment is made a tongue, if it is blown it will produce a gap, causing a sound. While the ends are wrapped with coconut leaves that resemble trumpets. The sound is shrill and the tone is generated by playing the fingers on the coiled coconut leaves. Now before the new year there is a new year's trumpet which is similar to this musical instrument, the difference is that now using plastic and a funnel using cardboard, and given the color gold.

Serunai 
The chrysanthemum, derived from the word Shehnai, is a musical instrument in the Indian Kashmir valley, consisting of two pieces of bamboo that are not equal in size; a small piece can fit into a larger piece; with a function as a tone generator. This instrument has four tone holes, which will produce a melodic sound. This tool is rarely used, in addition to being difficult to make, the resulting tone is also not used much.

Papuik Tanduak 
This musical instrument is made from buffalo horn (hoorn), and the ends are cut flat for blowing. The shape is shiny and clean black. Does not function as a singing or dance accompaniment, so as a whistle, without holes, so that only a single note. In the past, it was used for cues to the community, for example notifications at dawn and sunset or there were announcements from village leaders. In the past, the horns were used by large sailing ships as a sign or command to the crew, while the Arabs used drums and Europeans used bells and horns, and in the past, steam trains used bells when passing through crowds.

Talempong 
Talempong, In Java it is called Bonang, which is in the form of a small gong that is laid flat, and is made of brass, but some are also made of wood and stone. sounded it with a wooden punch. Usually talempong is used to accompany the Plate Dance, where the dancer rings the plate with the ring, and is interlocked. The chord starts with Do and ends with Si. How to play like marimba or kempul with a double note (left and right hand).

Rebab (Rebab Minang) 
comes from Arabic as Rebab, there are also other areas such as Deli, Sunda, Java, etc. Rabab Minang is very unique, besides being rubbed there is also a sound membrane under the bridge, so it has another effect (hoarseness). This unique property makes swiping difficult too. This Rabab body is made from coconut shells (Cocos nucifera).

Aguang (Gong) 
The term gong in the Minang language is aguang, the form is the same as in other areas, such as in Malay, Sundanese, Javanese, etc. The gong is usually the first, third, or closing stroke, while the gong is small in the second and fourth strokes. Then there are also variations according to the range.

Gandang (Minang drum) 
The term gendang in the Minang language is gandang (in the Karo Batak gondang language), the shape is the same as in other areas, such as in Malay, Batak, Sundanese, Javanese, etc. The way to play is the same, namely the small circle side on the left and the bigger one on the right. However, the method of hitting between each region is very different, namely in Minang depending on the type of song beat. Gandang Tasa is a traditional art of drumming which is popular in Padang Pariaman Regency.

Biola (Minang Biola) 
The violin later also became a traditional Minang musical instrument with several modifications according to the Minang tradition: the rabala and rabab darek. Rabab Pesisir Selatan (Rabab Pasisia) is one of the famous rabab games in West Sumatra with the famous rabab player, Hasan Basri.

See also 

 Music of Sumatra
 Music of Indonesia
Minangkabau people

Reference 

Indonesian music
Minangkabau 
Minangkabau people